Islam in the United States Virgin Islands is a minority religion in the territory.

History
Islam grew in the territory beginning in 1960s which mainly came from other Caribbean islands and the Middle East originally for work purposes. They brought their families and eventually settled down in the island. In 1978, the Muhammad Mosque was established as the first mosque in the territory. It was later renamed to Nur Mosque. In 1998, the first Islamic education named IQRA's Academy was opened. There are currently around 1,200 Muslims in the territory. This correspond to 1.37% out of population of 87,146.

Mosques
 Nur Mosque

See also
 Religion in the United States Virgin Islands

References